Hege Bakken Wahlquist (born 7 August 1992) is a Norwegian handball player who currently plays for Silkeborg-Voel KFUM.

She represented Norway in the 2011 Women's Junior European Handball Championship, placing 12th.

She is also a part of Norway's national recruit team in handball.

Achievements 
World Youth Championship:
Silver Medalist: 2010
Norwegian League:
Bronze Medalist: 2015/2016
Silver Medalist: 2014/2015
Norwegian Cup:
Silver Medalist: 2015

Individual awards
 All-Star Left Wing of Grundigligaen 2015/2016

References

Norwegian female handball players
1992 births
Living people
Expatriate handball players
Norwegian expatriate sportspeople in Denmark